Thomas Holme (died 1406), of York, was an English Member of Parliament.

He was a Member (MP) of the Parliament of England for City of York in February 1385 and 1386. He was Mayor of York 1373–4. He was the brother of Robert Holme and the son-in-law of Walter Frost, both also MPs.

References

14th-century births
1406 deaths
14th-century English people
People from York
Mayors of places in England
Members of the Parliament of England (pre-1707)